Pentila petreia, the common red pentila, is a butterfly in the family Lycaenidae. It is found in Sierra Leone, central Liberia, Ivory Coast, Ghana, Togo, Benin and western Nigeria. The habitat consists of dense forests.

Adults feed from extrafloral nectaries.

References

Butterflies described in 1874
Poritiinae
Butterflies of Africa
Taxa named by William Chapman Hewitson